Yamunabai Waikar, née Yamunabai Vikram Jawle was an Indian folk artist, known for her expertise in the Marathi folk traditions of Lavani and Tamasha, folk art forms involving music and dance and reported to be one of the leading exponents of the art genres. A recipient of the Sangeet Natak Akademi Award, she was honored by the Government of India, in 2012, with the fourth highest Indian civilian award of Padma Shri.

Biography

Yamunabai was born in Nunekalame village near Mahabaleshwar, in Satara district of Maharashtra in a family belonging to the Kolhati community. Her father was reported to be a drunkard and her mother busked and Yamnunabai, being the eldest of the five children, performed street dances with her mother. At the age of 10, she joined a folk art group from where she had her first lessons of Lavani. Later, when her father joined them, the family formed a Tamasha troupe with her father playing the Dholki while Bai and her cousin danced.

Looking for better earnings, the family moved to Mumbai and Yamunabai started performing Lavani and film songs on the streets of Mumbai. Encouraged by the success of her street shows, she did a stage show, which launched her stage career lasting till 1975, when the popularity of cinema and diminishing audience affected the returns. Though Yamunabai tried to revive her career once again forming a new troupe, gathering her nieces, the attempt was not successful. During this period, she is reported to have a completed a low cost housing project for the members of the Kolhati tribe, the tribe where she came from.

Yamunabai has shared the stage with the renowned Kathak guru, Birju Maharaj, who is reported to have appreciated her performance in 1975, staged in Delhi. The performance helped to revive her career once again and she had opportunity to perform in other parts of the country such as Kolkata, Bhopal, Raipur.

Awards and recognitions
Yamunabai Waikar is a recipient of several awards and honours such as the 
 Padma Shri in 2012
 Maharashtra State Award in 1990, 
 Sangeet Natak Akademi honoured Yamunabai in 1995 with their annual award 
 Sahakar Maharshi Shankarrao Mohite-Patil Lavani Kalavant award in 1997.
 Ahilyabai Holkar Award from the Government of Maharashtra in 2000 
 Nilu Phule Samman in 2010. 
 Life Time Achievement award of Tagore Ratna Samman in 2012. 
 Aditya Vikram Birla Kalasikhara Award from the Sangeet Kala Kendra, founded by Aditya Vikram Birla.in 2012 
 Rasikmani Shrikrishna Pandit Uttung Gunagaurav Award at the Uttung Anniversary Festival in 2014.

See also

 Lavani
 Tamasha
 Marathi theatre
 Birju Maharaj

References

External links
 

Living people
Recipients of the Padma Shri in arts
Recipients of the Sangeet Natak Akademi Award
Women musicians from Maharashtra
Indian women classical musicians
Indian folk musicians
People from Satara district
20th-century Indian musicians
Year of birth missing (living people)
21st-century Indian musicians
21st-century Indian women musicians
20th-century Indian women musicians